Plakuder Point (‘Nos Plakuder’ \'nos 'pla-ku-der\) is the point on the east side of the entrance to Misionis Bay on the northeast coast of Pickwick Island in the Pitt group of Biscoe Islands, Antarctica.

The point is named after the settlement of Plakuder in Northwestern Bulgaria.

Location
British mapping in 1971.

Maps
 British Antarctic Territory: Graham Coast.  Scale 1:200000 topographic map.  DOS 610 Series, Sheet W 65 64.  Directorate of Overseas Surveys, UK, 1971.
 Antarctic Digital Database (ADD). Scale 1:250000 topographic map of Antarctica. Scientific Committee on Antarctic Research (SCAR), 1993–2016.

References
 Bulgarian Antarctic Gazetteer. Antarctic Place-names Commission. (details in Bulgarian, basic data in English)
 Plakuder Point. SCAR Composite Antarctic Gazetteer.

External links
 Plakuder Point. Copernix satellite image

Headlands of the Biscoe Islands
Bulgaria and the Antarctic